Barbonymus balleroides is a species of ray-finned fish in the genus Barbonymus from south-east Asia. it is a widely eaten food fish and makes up the majority of the fish biomass in most of its range.

In East Malaysia and west java, it is called Lampam Lalawak or Lelawak while in central java it is called Balar or Bader fish. however this name is used for a variety of other different cyprinid species.

Description 
A maximum body length of 30 cm 

A base body color of metallic grey, with bright to greyish red on the eyes, pelvic, caudal and anal fin. Some specimens also sport yellowish-green marks on the gill plate.

Distribution 
The current distribution of the species is in the Danum Valley of Sabah, Malaysia and the waterways of west and central Java.

Habitat 
It inhabits fast to slow flowing permanent rivers, streams, and larger creeks. It is assumed that the species migrates into floodplains to breed during the monsoon

References 

Barbonymus
Fish described in 1842